The skimmers or perchers and their relatives form the Libellulidae, the largest dragonfly family in the world. It is sometimes considered to contain the Corduliidae as the subfamily Corduliinae and the Macromiidae as the subfamily Macromiinae. Even if these are excluded (as Silsby does), there remains a family of over 1000 species. With nearly worldwide distribution, these are almost certainly the most often seen of all dragonflies.

The genus Libellula is mostly New World, but also has one of the few endangered odonates from Japan: Libellula angelina. Many of the members of this genus are brightly colored or have banded wings. The related genus Plathemis includes the whitetails. The genus Celithemis contains several brightly marked species in the southern United States. Members of the genus Sympetrum are called darters (or meadowhawks in North America) and are found throughout most of the world, except Australia. Several Southern Hemisphere species in the genera Trithemis and Zenithoptera are especially beautiful. Other common genera include Tramea and Pantala.

The libellulids have stout-bodied larvae with the lower lip or labium developed into a mask over the lower part of the face.

Etymology
The family name may have been derived from the Latin libella which means "booklet".

Genera

The Libelluidae contain these genera:

Gallery

References

 Animal Diversity Web

Bibliography
 Silsby, Jill. 2001. Dragonflies of the World. Smithsonian Institution Press, Washington D.C.

External links

 
Libelluloidea
Taxa named by Jules Pierre Rambur
Odonata families